Bibin svijet ("Biba's World") is a humorous series that started broadcasting on April 18, 2006, and ended on January 15, 2011, on the RTL TV program in Croatia. Bibin svijet was directed by Aldo Tardozzi. It is one of the few Croatian series that was aired long after it was shot. According to ABG Plus's research, Bibin World is the most watched Croatian humorist series in 2008 on the territory of Croatia.

About 
A small grocery store is a place where cash registers Biba Fruk, Đurđa Hrković, Milivoj Babić, Vlado Krunčić and their boss Janko Piškorić work. Despite the great effort, something always goes wrong. Although Bibi's life does not differ from the life of other people (house-work-houses), her days are full of comic situations and troubles that come down because of her  language and free spirit. But in the end it all ends well. One thing is for sure - Bibin's world is a series full of ordinary people who find themselves in unusual situations. Biba at home lives with her children and her husband. She has 2 children, Darko who loves football and hang out with friends and Sandra, who wants to meet some boys and enjoy teen life. Biba loves her husband, who works as a car mechanic. At work she works with all sorts of customers, she is not always nice and she sometimes roasts peoples. His boss Janko Piškorić likes her, but he is very strict.

Characters 
Biserka "Biba" Fruk is the main character of the series. She lives in an apartment with her husband Martin and children Darko and Sandra. At home, it mostly cleans and cooks, sometimes watching television and resting. At work he works with his best friend Đurđa and she is only who understands she  but partially. They often talk together and go to each other. Piškorić is mostly nervous. She is sarcastic to customers, sometimes she roasts them. Biba has no neighbours, except in an episode, when he was not in good relations with him She successfully solves the problems.

Đurđa Hrković is Biba's best friend and they work together in the market. With Vlad and Milivoj, she is in good relationships, though she sometimes tells her that she is old. She lives with her mother in the apartment and she is bothered, so in the end her mom went to a nursing home. Her house is purple. Biba was only once in Đurđa's house at dinner at once at sleepover, and Đurđa was at Bibe several times. From a male, he was in good relationship with Goran, and several times he was on a deceit with men he finally said were weird.

Milivoj Babić  works in a supermarket. He is mostly in a sarcastic relationship with Biba and Đurđa, but they collaborated in an episode when they were striking. She was obsessed with women, so in a few episodes she had to do with Tamara, who was supposed to marry Biba's brother, so Biba did not respect her and broke up after several episodes, one of the reasons Milivoj complained about her cooking and discovered a weird shipment of flowers that actually sent Đurđa to snap it.

Vlado Krunčić also works in supermarket. She once talked to her mom about the dying cat, so Biba realized that her mom was dying, and that news spread to Piškorić, Đurđa and Milivoj. Later, they gathered in the government yard and there they realized that it was not his mom but the cat's mom's mom. Tjen, Biba was shocked, also Đurđa and Milivoj because they were sure that she said mother. Several times he was reading some newspaper featuring women and football with in.

Janko Piškorić is a supermarket manager who is spending most of his time in his office and calculates salaries and makes the order in the supermarket and plans to improve earnings (introducing a child's corner). With the woman divorced. All the employees were striking once because they were looking for higher wages. He was originally not a manager, even though he appeared in the first episode when he replaced the old boss, and he was snooping on a jar of garbage dumped at the supermarket floor.

Martin Fruk is Biba's husband who works as an auto mechanic with his best friend Goran. Through the series, 2 actors participated in it. She likes Biba very much, with Darko playing football, and she is often angry at Sandra for her puberty behaviour. One day at his workshop were Milivoj and his girlfriend, and while two of them were acting on a motorcycle, he went in to check if everything was okay with the workshop and he got angry and pushed them out. Although Biba is in good relations with Đurđa, Đurđa sometimes irritates Martia, but once enabled her to meet famous motorists. She/He is also very racist.

Sandra Fruk is the only Biba's daughter and oldest child. She often wants to find guys. Once he found one from Iceland, one of them helped her get 5 of the math test. The Dark is often angry because she wants to be the main one. She often says that her parents are shameful, and once she sent her to work at the supermarket to see her, and Sandra thought it was a chance to find a boyfriend. I told her a pie for new words (hot and cool). He also introduced an ice cream maker that increased its traffic.

Darko Fruk is the only Biba's son and youngest child. He often watches football with a dad, for example, when Đurđa refurbished the apartment for flooding in the living room, with the boy deciding to go to the first dinner at Biba, but because of the "wild and undisturbed" winding of Darko and his dad left and Đurđa screamed. Piškorić has once sent a threatening letter written in cut newspapers because he could not go to the cinema with his mom, and Đurđa decided to help him in that situation.

Seasons and episode by dates of airdate in Croatia

Sources
 Bibin svijet at RTL.hr 
 Epizode at RTL.hr 
 'Bibin svijet': Povratak Bibe Fruk u dućan

External links 

2006 Croatian television series debuts
2011 Croatian television series endings
Croatian comedy television series
RTL (Croatian TV channel) original programming